Powerscourt Waterfall is the second highest waterfall in Ireland at  high, it is located at the base of the Glensoulan Valley on the River Dargle near Enniskerry, County Wicklow. 

Powerscourt is overlooked by the peaks of Djouce and Maulin, and flows continuously all year in a horsetail-fan pattern. The waterfall is part of the Powerscourt Estate, which is open to the public for an entrance fee.

Geography
Powerscourt Waterfall, known in Irish as Eas Chonaill, lies at the base of the Glensoulan valley, a hanging valley, through which the River Dargle flows from its source on the southern slopes of Tonduff mountain, eventually falling into the steep corrie in which the waterfall lies.

Several mountains surround the upper section of the Glensoulan valley in a "horseshoe-shape", being: Maulin , Tonduff , War Hill , and Djouce .  The waterfall is bounded by Crone Woods on its northern section.

Geology
Geological Survey of Ireland (GSI) regard the waterfalls an "important site for both the glacial feature and for the geological influence of the rocks themselves on the formation of the waterfall"; and describe the Powerscourt corrie, in which the waterfall sits, as "a fine example of glacial erosion, where accumulated ice has scoured out a deep basin, with a waterfall flowing down the steep backwall".

The Powerscourt waterfall flows over Irish Ribband Group schists, which sit in a metamorphic aureole of Leinster granite.  The cleavage (or schistosity) dips steeply outwards, paralleling the sides of the granite pluton, which forms the surface over which the water cascades; however, the GSI note the contact between schist and granite is some distance upstream of the waterfall.

Both boulders of schist (a silvery-sheen appearance), and of granite (a speckled crystalline appearance), can be seen in the pools at the base of the waterfall.

Access
The waterfall is part of the Powerscourt Estate, who grant paid-access to the public through a separate visitor entrance (6 miles from the main estate entrance) during set times.  At the base of the waterfall are visitor facilities, car parking, picnic and barbecue area, and various concessions.

The waterfall can also be viewed from Ride Rock in Crone Woods, which also offers trails to the summit of Maulin. A 7-kilometre 3-hour hill-walking route known as the Maulin Circuit, takes in Crone Woods, Maulin and the Powerscourt waterfall.

Notable events
In August 1821, during the visit of King George IV to Ireland, Richard Wingfield, 5th Viscount Powerscourt dammed the waterfall so he could release a torrent while the two stood on the bridge below the falls. For reasons unknown, the king did not leave the banquet at Powerscourt House to view the waterfall, which was fortunate as, when the water was finally released, the bridge was washed away.

In popular culture
The waterfall appears in the medieval fantasy film Excalibur (1981) and the television historical drama series Vikings (2013–2020).

Some of the waterfalls scenes for Willow (film) were shot at these falls, although  Burney Falls in Norther California was also used for filming.

Gallery

See also

 Powerscourt Estate
 Glenmacnass Waterfall
 Torc Waterfall
 Sruth in Aghaidh an Aird, Ireland's highest waterfall

References

External links 
Official Website
Powerscourt Waterfall World Waterfall Database (2019)
SkyCam View of Powerscourt Waterfall. TheJournal.ie (2014)

Waterfalls of the Republic of Ireland
Tourist attractions in County Wicklow